The Bountiful Islands are a group of small islands in the Gulf of Carpentaria, northern Australia, belonging to the state of Queensland and within the Shire of Mornington.

They form an Important Bird Area because they support more than 1% of the global population of two bird species, with up to 2,000 pairs of roseate terns and 26–30,000 pairs of crested terns. It is around 450 hectares or 4.5 square km in size.

See also

List of islands of Australia

References

External links
Map showing the location of The Bountiful Islands on the Australian coastline

Islands of Queensland
Important Bird Areas of Queensland
Gulf of Carpentaria